Sannavalli is a village in Uppalaguptam Mandal, Dr. B.R. Ambedkar Konaseema district in the state of Andhra Pradesh in India.

Geography 

Demographics 
 India census, Sannavalli had a population of 1878, out of which 948 were male and 930 were female. The population of children below 6 years of age was 10%. The literacy rate of the village was 80%.

References 

Villages in Uppalaguptam mandal